The women's madison competition at the 2023 UEC European Track Championships was held on 12 February 2023.

Results
120 laps (30 km) with 12 sprints were raced.

References

Women's madison
European Track Championships – Women's madison